The Royal Family is a play written by George S. Kaufman and Edna Ferber. Its premiere on Broadway was at the Selwyn Theatre on 28 December 1927, where it ran for 345 performances to close in October 1928. It was included in Burns Mantle's The Best Plays of 1927–1928.

Characters
 Fanny Cavendish – Cavendish family matriarch
 Julie Cavendish – Fanny's daughter
 Tony Cavendish – Fanny's son
 Gwen Cavendish – Fanny's granddaughter
 Herbert Dean – Fanny's brother
 Kitty Dean – Fanny's sister-in-law
 Oscar Wolfe – Cavendish family's long-time agent
 Gilbert Marshall – Julie's love interest
 Perry Stewart – Gwen's fiancee

Productions

In Britain, Noël Coward directed the West End version of the play in 1934, with a cast that included Marie Tempest as  Fanny Cavendish, Madge Titheradge as Julie Cavendish and Laurence Olivier as Tony Cavendish. The play was retitled "Theatre Royal".

The play was revived in the 1975–76 season on Broadway. Directed by Ellis Rabb, it starred Rosemary Harris as Julie Cavendish, George Grizzard as Tony, and Eva Le Gallienne as the theatrical matriarch, Fanny and Sam Levene as Oscar Wolfe. Rabb received the 1976 Tony Award for best director. The production was telecast on the PBS series Great Performances on November 9, 1977, with Rabb replacing Grizzard as Tony. This version was released on DVD.

In 2001 Peter Hall directed a West End revival of the play (under its original title) with Judi Dench as Fanny, Harriet Walter as Julie and Toby Stephens as Tony; also in the cast were Peter Bowles, Julia McKenzie and Emily Blunt.

Adaptations

The play was adapted in 1930 by Herman Mankiewicz for the film The Royal Family of Broadway, released by Paramount Pictures. The film was directed by George Cukor and Cyril Gardner, and stars Ina Claire and Fredric March.

Several live television adaptions were produced, including one in 1952, a BBC film for television, starring Morton Lowry as Tony Cavendish and Charmion King as Julia, re-named as "Theatre Royal".

Awards and nominations 
Awards
 1975 Drama Desk Award for Outstanding Revival of a Play
2010 Nominated for Best Revival of a Play

References

Further reading

External links
 Full text of The Royal Family at HathiTrust Digital Library
 
 
 
 1945 Theatre Guild on the Air radio adaptation at Internet Archive

Plays about families
1927 plays
Broadway plays
Drama Desk Award-winning plays
West End plays
Plays by George S. Kaufman
Plays by Edna Ferber
Plays set in New York City
Doubleday, Doran books
American plays adapted into films